Lycurgus J. Conner (November 17, 1909 – May 28, 1963) was a lawyer, judge, and state legislator.

Born in Chicago, Illinois, Conner received his bachelor and law degrees from the University of Chicago. Conner was a lawyer and served as an assistant probate judge. He served in the United States Army during World War II in the judge advocate general office. Conner was a Democrat. Conner served in the Illinois House of Representatives from 1961 until his death from cancer in 1963. He died at his home in Chicago, Illinois.

Notes

1909 births
1963 deaths
Politicians from Chicago
University of Chicago alumni
University of Chicago Law School alumni
Lawyers from Chicago
Military personnel from Illinois
Democratic Party members of the Illinois House of Representatives
20th-century American politicians
Deaths from cancer in Illinois
20th-century American lawyers